Keith Eyre Carter (August 30, 1924 – May 3, 2013) was an American competition swimmer, a six time All American, an Olympic silver medalist and world record holder in the 200 yard breaststroke (long course).

Carter was an unusually gifted swimmer in both free style and breaststroke events.  At the 1948 Olympic trials, he was second behind Wally Ris in the 100 m freestyle, and second behind Joe Verdeur in the 200 m breaststroke.  Carter tried out for the 4 X 200 m freestyle relay and was one of several swimmers who had already qualified in other events who slowed down in their heats or swam fast in the prelims and scratched themselves for the final to allow more swimmers to qualify for the US Olympic Team.

At the 1948 Summer Olympics in London, Carter received a silver medal in the 200 m breaststroke in a three man American sweep of the event behind Joe Verdeur the gold medalist and ahead of Robert Sohl the bronze medalist.  In the men's 100 m freestyle, Carter finished fourth in the event final behind his teammates Wally Ris the gold medalist and Alan Ford the silver medalist, thus narrowly missing another American sweep of this event as well.

In 1949, Carter was the NCAA champion in the 200-yard breaststroke, National AAU Indoor 220 yd breaststroke champion and both times over his rival Joe Verdeur. He did not compete in the 1949 National AAU Outdoor championships.

No other swimmer in the pre bifurcation era of the breaststroke and butterfly events prior to 1953, was able to compete in both freestyle and butterfly (breaststroke/butterfly) events and obtain as high a ranking internationally (2nd in breaststroke/4th in the 100 freestyle in the Olympics) in both events as is common today with the butterfly swimmers now using the dolphin kick.

Carter attended Purdue University, where he majored in electrical engineering, and swam for the Purdue Boilermakers.  Before enrolling at Purdue, Carter served in the United States Army Air Forces for three years as a bombardier during World War II.

Carter was also a Masters swimmer, breaking the world record in the 100 short course meters fly in the 65-69 age group in 1990 with a 1:24.43.

Carter died May 3, 2013; he was 88 years old.

See also
 List of Olympic medalists in swimming (men)
 List of Purdue University people

References

External links
 
  Keith Carter – Sigma Chi profile at Thesighouse.com
  Radio interview – "Purdue alum remembers 1948 Olympics, silver medal win" from WBAA.org

1924 births
2013 deaths
American male breaststroke swimmers
American male freestyle swimmers
Olympic silver medalists for the United States in swimming
Purdue Boilermakers men's swimmers
Swimmers from Akron, Ohio
Swimmers at the 1948 Summer Olympics
Medalists at the 1948 Summer Olympics
Western Reserve Academy alumni
United States Army Air Forces personnel of World War II
United States Army Air Forces officers